The parrot-billed sparrow (Passer gongonensis) is found in the arid lowlands of eastern Africa. It is often considered a subspecies of the grey-headed sparrow.

References

External links
Parrot-billed sparrow on eBird

parrot-billed sparrow
Birds of East Africa
parrot-billed sparrow